The Concerto No. 3 for Piano and Orchestra "The Mysteries of Light" is the third piano concerto by the Scottish composer James MacMillan.  The work was commissioned by the Minnesota Orchestra and was first performed on April 14, 2011 in Orchestra Hall, Minneapolis, by the pianist Jean-Yves Thibaudet and the Minnesota Orchestra under the conductor Osmo Vänskä.

Composition

Background
MacMillan described the conception of the piece in the score program notes, writing:

Structure
The Piano Concerto No. 3 has a duration of roughly 25 minutes and is composed in five connected sections:
Baptisma Iesu Christi
Miraculum in Cana
Proclamatio Regni Dei
Transfiguratio Domini Nostri
Institutio Eucharistiae

Instrumentation
The work is scored for solo piano and an orchestra comprising three flutes (3rd doubling piccolo), two oboes, cor anglais, three clarinets (3rd doubling bass clarinet), two bassoons, contrabassoon, four horns, three trumpets, three trombones (3rd on bass trombone), tuba, timpani, three percussionists, harp, and strings.

Reception
Reviewing the world premiere, Larry Fuchsberg of the Star Tribune praised the concerto, writing, "The work, all 25 minutes of it, is a wild ride, overflowing with color and incident -- turbulent, incantatory and, at moments, luminous."  Reviewing a 2013 performance of the work with the Atlanta Symphony Orchestra, Mark Gresham of ArtsATL described the piece as "virtuosic for both pianist and orchestra" and described the audience's overall reaction, remarking:
Jay Nordlinger of The New Criterion also lauded the piece, writing, "Though only twenty-five minutes, the concerto felt a little long to me. Does it have a 'heavenly length,' as would befit a religious concerto? I'm not sure. I look forward to hearing the concerto again. What is beyond doubt is that James MacMillan is a serious composer who loves music and has important things to say. He does not write frivolously—except when frivolity is called for!—and he writes well."

See also
List of compositions by James MacMillan

References

Concertos by James MacMillan
2008 compositions
MacMillan 3
Music commissioned by the Minnesota Orchestra